Lake Lillian is a  freshwater lake in northern Highlands County, Florida. It is adjacent to the Avon Park Lakes Subdivision, north of the city of Avon Park.

This lake has no public access, as it is entirely surrounded by private property.  On the northeast side is the now vacant Walker Memorial Hospital.  On the southwest side is the local Seventh-day Adventist Church.

History

On the northeast shore the Highlands Lake Hotel was built in the 1920s.  It featured the hotel, a casino and an 18-hole golf course.  The Great Depression of the 1930s forced the hotel out of business.  A purchaser in 1936 planned to convert the property into a health resort, but nothing materialized, as the scheme was said to be fraudulent.  In World War II the US government purchased the hotel and converted it into the Lodwick Aviation Military Academy.  The Academy included a barracks built to the north of the old hotel.  The barracks housed cadets training to be Army Air Corps pilots.

The Academy closed at the end of the war and in 1946 plans were begun to transform the old hotel into a hospital.  The Seventh-Day Adventist Church was to own and operate the hospital.  Charles Walker was the president of the organization instrumental in the effort.  He died of a heart attack before the hospital could be opened in 1948.

The hospital opened as Walker Memorial Sanitarium and Hospital, in honor of Charles Walker.  The name was shortened later to Walker Memorial Hospital.  The hospital prospered and grew over the years.  Satellite facilities were added in Lake Placid in 1982 and in Wauchula in 1992.  The building was extensively remodelled, but the demands of the community overwhelmed the facility.  As a result, the Adventists built Florida Hospital Heartland Medical Center in Sebring, which opened in 1997. The old Walker Hospital remained vacant, although at least two remodelling projects were considered.  In 2004 the building was severely damaged by the triple blows of Hurricanes Charley, Frances and Jeanne.  Another hurricane passed over the area in 2005.

In 2007, the old Walker Memorial Hospital was demolished, so the lakeside property could be used for a new commercial development.  The new project was abandoned, because of poor economic conditions.

References
 Florida Lakewatch
 Florida Hospital Heartland Division

Lillian
Lillian